Catoria delectaria is a moth of the family Geometridae. It is found in Australia (Queensland).

Adults are grey with submarginal arcs of dark spots on each wing.

Subspecies
Catoria delectaria delectaria
Catoria delectaria plesia (Swinhoe, 1907)
Catoria delectaria vernans Prout, 1929

References

Moths described in 1866
Boarmiini